NMEA 0183 is a combined electrical and data specification for communication between marine electronics such as echo sounder, sonars, anemometer, gyrocompass, autopilot, GPS receivers and many other types of instruments. It has been defined and is controlled by the National Marine Electronics Association (NMEA). It replaces the earlier NMEA 0180 and NMEA 0182 standards. In leisure marine applications it is slowly being phased out in favor of the newer NMEA 2000 standard, though NMEA 0183 remains the norm in commercial shipping.

Details
The electrical standard that is used is EIA-422, although most hardware with NMEA-0183 outputs are also able to drive a single EIA-232 port. Although the standard calls for isolated inputs and outputs, there are various series of hardware that do not adhere to this requirement.

The NMEA 0183 standard uses a simple ASCII, serial communications protocol that defines how data are transmitted in a "sentence" from one "talker" to multiple "listeners" at a time.  Through the use of intermediate expanders, a talker can have a unidirectional conversation with a nearly unlimited number of listeners, and using multiplexers, multiple sensors can talk to a single computer port.

At the application layer, the standard also defines the contents of each sentence (message) type, so that all listeners can parse messages accurately.

While NMEA0183 only defines an RS422 transport, there also exists a de facto standard in which the sentences from NMEA0183 are placed in UDP datagrams (one sentence per packet) and sent over an IP network.

The NMEA standard is proprietary and sells for at least US$2000 (except for members of the NMEA) as of September 2020. However, much of it has been reverse-engineered from public sources.

Serial configuration (data link layer) 

There is a variation of the standard called NMEA-0183HS that specifies a baud rate of 38,400. This is in general use by AIS devices.

Message structure 
 All transmitted data are printable ASCII characters between 0x20 (space) to 0x7e (~) 
 Data characters are all the above characters except the reserved characters (See next line)
 Reserved characters are used by NMEA0183 for the following uses:

 Messages have a maximum length of 82 characters, including the $ or ! starting character and the ending <LF>
 The start character for each message can be either a $ (For conventional field delimited messages) or ! (for messages that have special encapsulation in them)
 The next five characters identify the talker (two characters) and the type of message (three characters).
 All data fields that follow are comma-delimited.
 Where data is unavailable, the corresponding field remains blank (it contains no character before the next delimiter – see Sample file section below).
 The first character that immediately follows the last data field character is an asterisk, but it is only included if a checksum is supplied.
 The asterisk is immediately followed by a checksum represented as a two-digit hexadecimal number. The checksum is the bitwise exclusive OR of ASCII codes of all characters between the $ and *, not inclusive. According to the official specification, the checksum is optional for most data sentences, but is compulsory for RMA, RMB, and RMC (among others).
  ends the message.

As an example, a waypoint arrival alarm has the form:
 $GPAAM,A,A,0.10,N,WPTNME*32

Another example for AIS messages is:
!AIVDM,1,1,,A,14eG;o@034o8sd<L9i:a;WF>062D,0*7D

NMEA sentence format 
The main talker ID includes:

 BD or GB - Beidou
 GA - Galileo
 GP - GPS
 GL - GLONASS.

NMEA message mainly include the following "sentences" in the NMEA message:

One example, the sentence for Global Positioning System Fixed Data for GPS should be "$GPGGA".

Vendor extensions 
Most GPS manufacturers include special messages in addition to the standard NMEA set in their products for maintenance and diagnostics purposes. Extended messages begin with "$P". These extended messages are not standardized.

Software compatibility 
NMEA 0183 is supported by various navigation and mapping software. Notable applications include:
 DeLorme Street Atlas
 ESRI
 Google Earth
 Google Maps Mobile Edition
 gpsd - Unix GPS Daemon
 JOSM - OpenStreetMap Map Editor
 MapKing
 Microsoft MapPoint
 Microsoft Streets & Trips
 NetStumbler
 OpenCPN - Open source navigation software
 OpenBSD's hw.sensors framework with the nmea(4) pseudo-device driver
 OpenNTPD through sysctl  API
 Rand McNally StreetFinder
 ObserVIEW

Sample file 

A sample file produced by a Tripmate 850 GPS logger. This file was produced in Leixlip, County Kildare, Ireland. The record lasts two seconds.

$GPGGA,092750.000,5321.6802,N,00630.3372,W,1,8,1.03,61.7,M,55.2,M,,*76
$GPGSA,A,3,10,07,05,02,29,04,08,13,,,,,1.72,1.03,1.38*0A
$GPGSV,3,1,11,10,63,137,17,07,61,098,15,05,59,290,20,08,54,157,30*70
$GPGSV,3,2,11,02,39,223,19,13,28,070,17,26,23,252,,04,14,186,14*79
$GPGSV,3,3,11,29,09,301,24,16,09,020,,36,,,*76
$GPRMC,092750.000,A,5321.6802,N,00630.3372,W,0.02,31.66,280511,,,A*43
$GPGGA,092751.000,5321.6802,N,00630.3371,W,1,8,1.03,61.7,M,55.3,M,,*75
$GPGSA,A,3,10,07,05,02,29,04,08,13,,,,,1.72,1.03,1.38*0A
$GPGSV,3,1,11,10,63,137,17,07,61,098,15,05,59,290,20,08,54,157,30*70
$GPGSV,3,2,11,02,39,223,16,13,28,070,17,26,23,252,,04,14,186,15*77
$GPGSV,3,3,11,29,09,301,24,16,09,020,,36,,,*76
$GPRMC,092751.000,A,5321.6802,N,00630.3371,W,0.06,31.66,280511,,,A*45
Note some blank fields, for example:
 GSV records, which describe satellites 'visible', lack the SNR (signal–to–noise ratio) field for satellite 16 and all data for satellite 36.
 GSA record, which lists satellites used for determining a fix (position) and gives a DOP of the fix, contains 12 fields for satellites' numbers, but only 8 satellites were taken into account—so 4 fields remain blank.

Status 
NMEA 0183 continued to be maintained separately: V4.10 was published in early May 2012, and an erratum noted on 12 May 2012. 
On November 27, 2018, it was issued an update to version 4.11, which supports Global Navigation Satellite Systems other than GPS.

See also 
 GPS Exchange Format
 TransducerML
 IEEE 1451
 IEC 61162
 NMEA 2000
 NMEA OneNet
 RTCM SC-104
 RINEX

References

External links 
 National Marine Electronics Association
 NMEA's website about NMEA 0183
 NMEA Specifications at APRS Info

Global Positioning System
Network protocols
Computer buses
Marine electronics
Satellite navigation